John David Crawford (1954–1998) was a physicist and professor at the University of Pittsburgh. He obtained his undergraduate degree with honors from Princeton University in 1977
and his Ph.D. from University of California, Berkeley in 1983.

An internationally recognized researcher in theoretical physics, he specialized in plasma physics and nonlinear dynamics.
His broad physical insight and deep knowledge of mathematics enabled him to make profound contributions in dynamical systems.
He published more than 80 research papers and wrote a landmark review on bifurcation theory. Additionally, he was also a codirector of the "Research Experiences for Undergraduates" program, which exposed undergraduates to scientific study, in 1997.

Apart from his research, he was a passionate mountain climber. He died on August 23, 1998 at the Montefiore Hospital in Pittsburgh of Burkitt's lymphoma, a form of lymph cancer.

In 2001, SIAM's Activity Group in Dynamical Systems established the J.D. Crawford Prize, which is now the world's top
award in dynamical systems.

References

1954 births
1998 deaths
20th-century American physicists
20th-century American mathematicians
University of Pittsburgh faculty
Princeton University alumni
University of California, Berkeley alumni
Deaths from lymphoma
American mountain climbers